This is a list of the first minority male lawyer(s) and judge(s) in Tennessee. It includes the year in which the men were admitted to practice law (in parentheses). Also included are other distinctions such as the first minority men in their state to graduate from law school or become a political figure.

Firsts in Tennessee's history

Lawyers 

First African American male to argue a case before the Tennessee Supreme Court: William F. Yardley (1872) in 1883  
First African American male (actively practice): Fredrick McGhee (1885)

State judges 

 First African American male (since Reconstruction): Benjamin Hooks (1948) in 1965  
 First African American male (General Sessions Court): A. A. Birch Jr. (1956) in 1969 
 First African American male (city court): S.A. Wilbun in 1973  (1973) 
 First African American male (circuit court) S.A. Wilbun in 1978 (1978) 
 First African American male (criminal court): A. A. Birch Jr. (1956) in 1978
 First African American male (Tennessee Supreme Court): George H. Brown in 1980 
 First African American male (Chief Justice; Tennessee Supreme Court): A. A. Birch Jr. (1956) in 1994 
 First Hispanic American male (trial court judge): Hector Sanchez in 2022

Federal judges 
First African American male (U.S. District Court for the Western District of Tennessee): Odell Horton (1956) in 1980  
First African American male (U.S. District Court for the Middle District of Tennessee): William Joseph Haynes Jr. (1973) in 1999

Assistant United States Attorney 

First African American male: Odell Horton (1956)

Assistant District Attorney 

 First African American males (since Reconstruction): Arthur T. Bennett and A. A. Birch Jr. (1956) respectively around 1965-1966

Faculty 

 First African American male law professor: Joseph H. Dismukes in 1883

Firsts in local history 
 Prince Albert Ewing: First African American male lawyer in Nashville, Davidson County, Tennessee
A. A. Birch Jr. (1956): First African American male to serve as a prosecutor and judge in Davidson County, Tennessee
Martesha L. Johnson (2018)  First African American to serve as a Chief Public Defender for Metro Nashville, Davidson County and second woman.
Rheubin Taylor: First African American male to serve as the County Attorney for Hamilton County, Tennessee (1994)
Gerald Webb: First African American male judge in Hamilton County, Tennessee (2019)
William Francis Yardley (1872): First African American male lawyer in Knoxville, Knox County, Tennessee
General Quarles Boyd: First African American male lawyer in Clarksville, Montgomery County, Tennessee
John McClellan Sr.: First African American male to serve as the Justice of the Peace in Putnam County, Tennessee (1972)
Thomas Frank Cassels: First African American male to serve as the Attorney General Pro Tem of Shelby County Criminal Court (c. 1880s)
 Josiah T. Settle (1875): First African American male to serve as a prosecutor in Shelby County, Tennessee
 Ural B. Adams: First African American male to serve as the Public Defender of Shelby County, Tennessee (1979)
 Floyd Peete: First African American male to serve as the Chancellor of Shelby County Chancery Court (1990)
 S.A. Wilbun: First African American male to serve as the Assistant City Attorney in Memphis, Tennessee (1964) [Shelby County, Tennessee]
 Joe Brown: First African American male prosecutor in Memphis, Tennessee [Shelby County, Tennessee]
 Tarik Sugarmon: First African American male to serve as a juvenile court judge in Shelby County, Tennessee (2022)

See also 

 List of first minority male lawyers and judges in the United States

Other topics of interest 

 List of first women lawyers and judges in the United States
 List of first women lawyers and judges in Tennessee

References 

 
Minority, Tennessee, first
Minority, Tennessee, first
Legal history of Tennessee
Lists of people from Tennessee
Tennessee lawyers